Portugal competed at the 2011 World Championships in Athletics from August 27 to September 4 in Daegu, South Korea. The Portuguese Athletics Federation announced a squad of 25 athletes (12 men and 13 women).

Among the medal hopefuls are Nelson Évora (reigning Olympic champion in men's triple jump), Rui Silva (1500-metre bronze medalist at the 2004 Olympic Games and 2005 World Championships), Jéssica Augusto (2010 European cross-country champion and 10,000-metre bronze medalist at the 2010 European Championships), Sara Moreira (5000-metre bronze medalist at the 2010 European Championships), and Susana Feitor (20-km walk bronze medalist at the 2005 World Championships), who will compete for an all-time record 11th consecutive time at these Championships.

Results

Men

Women

References

External links
Official local organising committee website
Official IAAF competition website

Nations at the 2011 World Championships in Athletics
2011
World Championships in Athletics